American Idol is an American talent reality television series that first aired in 2002. As of May 2022, there have been eighteen seasons. Each season, the final round of competition features ten to thirteen singers.  A total of 178 contestants have reached the finals of their season. The show's age requirements have varied year-to-year. Of the finalists, 55 of them were under the age of 20, including three winners and five runners-up. First season-winner Kelly Clarkson currently holds the record for the highest-selling album sales worldwide, with more than 25 million copies, while fourth season-winner Carrie Underwood currently holds the record for the highest-selling album sales in the United States, with more than 13 million copies.

In first season, Jim Verraros, an openly gay contestant, was told by Fox to remove all mentions of his homosexuality from his online journal as producers "thought [he] was trying to gain more votes". During the second season, finalist Corey Clark was disqualified when it was revealed that he had been arrested and charged with resisting arrest, battery upon his sister, and criminal restraint. In fifth season, voters claimed that phone calls dialed for Chris Daughtry during the first few minutes of voting were misrouted to Katharine McPhee's lines, when they heard her recorded message thanking them for voting for McPhee. In seventh season, it was revealed that Carly Smithson held a prior label record deal with MCA Records.  Reports suggested that MCA spent over $2 million promoting Smithson's previous album which she made under the name Carly Hennessy. The album sold fewer than 400 copies. Smithson remained on the show, and placed sixth in her season. Jermaine Jones of eleventh season was disqualified for having theft cases and outstanding warrants on Top 11 week.

Contestants

Notes
Contestant's age at the time the season's final round began.

References

General
 
 
 
 
 
 
 
 
 
 
 
Specific

External links

 
American Idol